Francisco Dova (born 1903, date of death unknown) was an Argentine sprinter. He competed in the men's 400 metres at the 1924 Summer Olympics.

References

External links
 

1903 births
Year of death missing
Athletes (track and field) at the 1924 Summer Olympics
Argentine male sprinters
Olympic athletes of Argentina
Place of birth missing
20th-century Argentine people